The Arri Group is a German manufacturer of motion picture film equipment.  Based in Munich, the company was founded in 1917. It produces professional motion picture cameras, lenses, lighting and post-production equipment.  Hermann Simon mentioned this company in his book Hidden Champions of the 21st Century as an example of a "hidden champion". The Arri Alexa camera system was used to film Academy Award winners for Best Cinematography including Hugo, Life of Pi, Gravity, Birdman, The Revenant and 1917.

History

Early history
Arri was founded in Munich, Germany on 12 September 1917 by August Arnold and Robert Richter as Arnold & Richter Cine Technik. The acronym Arri was derived from the initial two letters of the founders' surnames, Arnold and Richter.

In 1924, Arnold and Richter developed their first film camera, the small and portable Kinarri 35. In 1937, Arri introduced the world's first reflex mirror shutter in the Arriflex 35 camera, an invention of longtime engineer Erich Kästner. This technology employs a rotating mirror that allows a continuous motor to operate the camera while providing parallax-free reflex viewing to the operator, and the ability to focus the image by eye through the viewfinder, much like an SLR camera for photography. The reflex design was subsequently used in almost every professional motion picture film camera and is still used in the Arri Alexa Studio digital camera. The first Hollywood film to employ an Arriflex was the 1947 Humphrey Bogart and Lauren Bacall film Dark Passage in 1947. Over the years, more than 17,000 Arriflex 35s were built. The design was recognized with two Scientific and Technical Academy Awards in 1966 and 1982.

1950–1989

In 1952, Arri introduced the Arriflex 16ST, the first professional 16mm camera with a reflex viewing system. In 1965,  a self-blimped 16mm camera was released: the Arriflex 16BL. The Arriflex 35BL followed in 1972 as a lightweight, quiet alternative to the rather heavy and cumbersome blimped cameras of the time. Also in 1972, Arri pioneered the development of daylight luminaires with the Arrisonne 2000 W. The Arriflex 16SR, launched in 1975, featured a redesigned viewfinder with a through-the-lens light meter. The Arriflex 765, a 65mm camera, was released in 1989, partly in response to the growing industry demand for 70mm release prints.

1990–2009
The Arriflex 535 camera was released in 1990, followed by the Arriflex 535B and the Arriflex 16SR 3 in 1992. The Arriflex 435 was released in 1994.

Arri partnered with Carl Zeiss AG in order to develop and manufacture advanced lenses for the motion picture industry. In 1998, Arri released the Ultra Prime lenses.

Development of the Arrilaser, a postproduction film recorder, began in 1997 and it was released for beta testing in 1998.

In 2000, Arri purchased the company Moviecam and developed Arricam, a 35mm camera platform. In 2003, Arri developed its first digital camera, the Arriflex D-20, which later evolved into the D-21. The camera used a 35mm CMOS sensor (instead of CCD) and allowed cinematographers to utilize standard 35mm lenses. This technology was further developed and improved for the Arri Alexa camera.

Arri revealed its Arriscan prototype during IBC 2003. The 16mm/35mm film scanner worked alongside the Arrilaser to support the increasingly popular digital intermediate route through postproduction. Later, the Arriscan became a widely used tool for film restoration work and was recognized with a Scientific and Engineering Academy Award in 2009.

Arri released the Master Prime lenses in 2005, designed for a super-fast aperture of T1.3 without breathing and distortion. In 2007, the Master Prime 14mm and 150mm lenses were released.

The Arrilaser 2 was released in 2009, with new client-server architecture and speeds twice as fast as the original model. In 2011, the Arrilaser was recognized with an Academy Award of Merit.

2010–present
In 2010, the Arri Alexa camera was released. The camera had the ability to compress 1080p footage to ProRes QuickTime formats and allowed direct-to-edit workflows. Later models added to the range included the Alexa Plus, Alexa Studio and Alexa M, which was designed to get the camera closer to the action. The Alexa Plus 4:3, like the Alexa Studio, allowed the full area of the sensor to be used with anamorphic lenses. 
 

The 16mm Arriflex 416 camera and Ultra Prime 16 lenses were used in the filming of the 2010 film Black Swan.

Arri announced a strategic partnership with Zeiss and Fujinon in 2010 to create new lenses that incorporated enhanced electronic lens data transfer in order to simplify visual effects workflows in postproduction. The Arri/Fujinon Alura Zooms were released that same year, while the Arri/Zeiss Master Anamorphic lens series was released in 2012.

In 2013, Arri created Arri Medical, a business unit that utilizes its camera technology for medical purposes. Apart from a medical imaging documentation service, it has developed a fully digital 3D surgical microscope called the Arriscope.

 
The Arri Alexa 65, released in 2014, was used in the filming of The Revenant as well as Mission: Impossible – Rogue Nation and Star Wars: Rogue One. The Arri Amira camera was also released in 2014. In 2015, four of the five nominees for the cinematography category of the Academy Awards were filmed using the Arri Alexa.

Arri's subsidiary postproduction and creative services company, Arri Film & TV, was renamed Arri Media in 2015 as part of a company restructuring. At NAB 2015, the SkyPanel LED fixtures were introduced by Arri. The SC60 and the SC30 have a full color tunable LED option.

In April 2016, Arri acquired the Artemis camera stabilizer systems developed by Curt O. Schaller from Sachtler / Vitec Videocom. As a result, Arri became the exclusive seller of Artemis Trinity stabilizers. At NAB 2016, Arri unveiled its version of the Trinity system.

Awards

Products
Camera lines
 Kinarri 35 (1924)
 Kinarri 16 (1928)
 Arriflex 35 (1937)
 Arriflex 35 II (1946)
 Arriflex 16ST (1952)
 Arriflex 16M (1960)
 Arriflex 35 IIC (1964)
 Arriflex 16BL (1965)
 Arritechno 35 (1970)
 Arriflex 35BL (1972)
 Arriflex 16SR (1975)
 Arriflex 35BL II (1975)
 Arriflex 35BL III (1980)
 Arriflex 35 IIIC (1982)
 Arriflex 16SR2 (1982)
 Arriflex 35BL 4 (1986)
 Arriflex 35BL 4S (1988)
 Arriflex 765 (1989)
 Arriflex 535 (1990)
 Arriflex 535 B (1992)
 Arriflex 16SR 3 (1992)
 Arriflex 435 (1994)
 Arriflex 435 ES (1995)
 Arricam Studio and Lite (2000)
 Arriflex 235 (2003)
 Arriflex D-20/21 (2003/2008)
 Arriflex 416 (2006)
 Arri Alexa (2010)
 Arri Amira (2013)
 Arri Alexa 65 (2014)
 Arri Alexa Mini (2015)
 Arri Alexa SXT (2016)
 Arri Alexa LF (2018)
 Arri Alexa Mini LF (2019)
 Arri Alexa 35 (2022)

Lighting
 Arri Fresnel (1937)
 Arri Gigant (1952)
 Arrisonne 2000 (1972)
 Arri Apollo (1979)
 Arri Studio (1988)
 Arri Compact Daylight (1991)
 Arrisun 40/25 (1992)
 Arrilux Pocket PAR (1996)
 ARRIMAX 18/12 (2005)
 Arri M40 (2011)
 Arri L7 LED Fresnel (2011)
 Arri SkyPanel S60-C (2015)
Arri SkyPanel S120-C
Arri SkyPanel S360-C
Arri SkyPanel S30-C
Arri Orbiter (2019)
Stellar Lighting Control App

Camera stabilizers
 artemis Maxima Stabilizer
 artemis Trinity

Film recorder
 Arrilaser film recorder, used for film-out

Film scanner
 Arriscan

Corporate espionage
In 2011, it was alleged that Michael Bravin, an executive of the US-based subsidiary Arri Inc., had unlawfully accessed a rival company email account. A suit was brought before a US court and in September 2011, Bravin entered a guilty plea. Arri Inc. denied knowledge or gains from Bravin's actions, and a separate lawsuit against the company was dropped as a result of an out-of-court settlement.

See also
Carl Zeiss AG
Panavision
Red Digital Cinema
Comparison of movie cameras

References

External links

Arri's cameras histories in CinemaTechnic website
Reviews: D-20 & D-21 on The Reel Show
Arriflex 16 S operating instructions - PDF
Discussion and demonstration of the Arriflex ST 16mm film camera by ex BBC cameramen Brian Tufano and David Whitson

Film and video technology
German brands
Manufacturing companies based in Munich
Movie camera manufacturers
Movie cameras
Photography companies of Germany
Recipients of the Scientific and Technical Academy Award of Merit